Hauerseter is a village in Ullensaker, Akershus, Norway.

In rail transport, the village was covered by Hauerseter Station on the Trunk Line, formerly also a terminus on the Hauerseter–Gardermoen Line. The local sports club is Hauerseter SK.

Villages in Akershus
Ullensaker